Vital Tarashchyk (born 18 May 1980) is a retired Belarusian professional footballer. His latest club was Lida in 2013. In 2016, he worked as FC Lida head coach.

Honours
MTZ-RIPO Minsk
Belarusian Cup winner: 2004–05

Naftan Novopolotsk
Belarusian Cup winner: 2008–09

External links

1980 births
Living people
Belarusian footballers
Association football midfielders
FC Neman Grodno players
FC Partizan Minsk players
FC Naftan Novopolotsk players
FC Gomel players
FC Dnepr Mogilev players
FC Lida players
Belarusian football managers
FC Lida managers